Pandesic was an Intel-SAP joint venture founded in August 1997 intended to sell software and hardware to support e-commerce. In July 2000, it was shut down after failing to find "a timely road to profitability".

The company's failings inspired a Harvard Business School case study.

References

SAP SE
Defunct online companies of the United States
Web frameworks
Defunct companies based in California
Online companies of the United States
Joint ventures
1997 software
Software companies disestablished in 2000